How Did a Nice Girl Like You Get Into This Business? ( and also known as The Naughty Cheerleader) is a 1970 West German comedy film directed by Will Tremper and starring Barbi Benton. It is based on the novel of the same title, written by Lynn Keefe.

Cast
 Barbi Benton as Lynn Keefe (as Barbara Benton)
 Hampton Fancher as Gino
 Jeff Cooper as Bob Greene
 Broderick Crawford as B.J Hankins
 Marc De Vries as Ronnie
 Claude Farell as Mrs. Epstein
 Hugh Hefner as Himself
 Klaus Kinski as Juan José Ignatio Rodriguez de Calderon, 'Sam'
 Lisa Lesco
 Bruce Low as Ist Smirna brother
 Paul Muller as The Director
 Roman Murray as Frank
 Max Nosseck as 2nd Smirna brother
 Massimo Serato as Capitano
 Lionel Stander as The Admiral
 Clyde Ventura as Nick
 José Luis de Vilallonga as Mr. Epstein
 Horst Wendlandt as Reporter with cigar behind the hotel in Miami Beach (uncredited)
 Christian Anders (minor role)

References

External links

1970 films
1970 comedy films
German comedy films
Italian comedy films
West German films
1970s English-language films
English-language German films
English-language Italian films
Films directed by Will Tremper
Films set in the United States
Films set in Italy
Films produced by Horst Wendlandt
Films scored by Klaus Doldinger
Films based on American novels
Films about prostitution in the United States
Teensploitation
1970s German films
1970s Italian films